Whitehill Wood may refer to:

Whitehill Wood, Aberdeenshire
Whitehill Wood, Ayrshire
Whitehill Wood, Monmouthshire
Whitehill Wood, Oxfordshire
Whitehill Wood, South Lanarkshire 
Whitehill Wood, Warwickshire 
Whitehills Woods, County Durham